Punta Ferraione Lighthouse is an active lighthouse located on the eastern tip of a small bay which delimits the harbour of the island of Capraia in the Tuscan Archipelago on the Tyrrhenian Sea.

Description
The lantern and the lantern roof have an octagonal shape and are painted grey metallic. Though the lighthouse is automated and there is no keeper in service, the building accommodate the local office of the Guardia Costiera.

The lighthouse is completely automated and managed by the Marina Militare with the identification code number 1996 E.F.

See also
 List of lighthouses in Italy
 Capraia

References

External links

 Servizio Fari Marina Militare

Lighthouses in Tuscany
Buildings and structures in the Province of Livorno
Lighthouses completed in 1868
1868 establishments in Italy
Lighthouses completed in 1908
Capraia Isola
Lighthouses in Italy